The Płock Diadem was created in the beginning of the 13th century probably in Hungary. This filigree diadem is wrought of extremely pure gold and set with sapphires, rubies, almandines and pearls.

History
The diadem was brought to Poland by one of the Hungarian princesses. Later  assigned to Konrad I of Masovia, Duke of Masovia it served as the personal crown of the Dukes of Masovia and was kept in the Płock Cathedral.

In 1601 by order of King Sigismund III Vasa the diadem was placed by a goldsmith Stanisław Zemelka on reliquary of St. Sigismund (patron saint of the King, also kept in the Płock Cathedral). This reliquary takes the form of a bust and it was established by King Casimir III the Great in the 14th century to comprise relics of that saint. The reliquary was made in Kraków between 1351–1356 and it depicts the King.

The reliquary was looted by the Germans during World War II, and later reclaimed.

See also
Płock Cathedral
Polish Crown Jewels
Royal Casket
Szczerbiec

References

External links

Herma of St. Sigismund
Płock Diadem

Medieval crowns
Individual crowns
Polish monarchy
Płock